Kenny Easwaran is an Indian American philosopher and Associate Professor of Philosophy at Texas A&M University.
His expertise lies in epistemology, decision theory, mathematical logic and philosophy of mathematics. Easwaran is an associate editor of Journal of Philosophical Logic. Two of his articles have been selected as among the "ten best" of their year by the Philosopher's Annual.

See also
Forcing (mathematics)

References

External links

Kenny Easwaran at Texas A&M University
Kenny Easwaran at Google Scholar

21st-century American philosophers
Analytic philosophers
Philosophy academics
Stanford University alumni
University of California, Berkeley alumni
University of Southern California faculty
Texas A&M University faculty
Living people
Year of birth missing (living people)